was a town located in Naga District, Wakayama Prefecture, Japan.

As of 2003 town had an estimated population of 15,111 and a density of 311.89 persons per km². The total area was 48.45 km².

On November 11, 2005, Uchita, along with the towns of Kishigawa, Kokawa, Momoyama and Naga (all from Naga District), was merged to create the city of Kinokawa.

External links
Official town website 
Kinokawa city 

Dissolved municipalities of Wakayama Prefecture
Kinokawa, Wakayama